The Mulanje Mountain Conservation Trust (MMCT) is a conservation trust in Malawi.

The trust focuses on the Mulanje Mountain Forest Reserve.

The Mulanje Mountain Conservation Trust was established in 2000 as a non-governmental organization and became a conservation trust fund in 2005.

The trust is based in Mulanje of Southern Region, Malawi. The trust is funded by the World Bank through the Global Environment Facility.

The trust was partnered with the United States Agency for International Development.

References 

Nature conservation in Malawi